Baguette is a long thin loaf of French bread.

Baguette may also refer to:
Baguette cut
Baguette (horse), Australian bred Thoroughbred racehorse
Bertrand Baguette (born 1986), Belgian racing driver
Cyprien Baguette (born 1989), Belgian football goalkeeper
Baguette (bag), handbag